The 2021 Women's European Qualifier was the European qualification tournament for the 2022 Women's FIH Hockey World Cup. The tournament was held at CUS Pisa in Pisa, Italy from 21 to 24 October 2021.

The tournament was originally scheduled to be held in Rome but on 3 September 2021 it was announced the tournament was moved to Pisa because of the better facilities there.

The top five teams from the 2021 EuroHockey Championship already qualified for the 2022 Women's FIH Hockey World Cup and the winner of this tournament joined them.

Qualification
The bottom three teams from the 2021 EuroHockey Championship and the top 5 from the 2021 EuroHockey Championship II participated in the tournament.

Results
All times are local (UTC+2).

Bracket

Fifth place bracket

Quarter-finals

5–8th place semi-finals

Semi-finals

Seventh place game

Fifth place game

Third place game

Final

Statistics

Final standings

Goalscorers

See also
2023 Men's FIH Hockey World Cup – European Qualifier

References

European Qualifier
International women's field hockey competitions hosted by Italy
Sport in Pisa
FIH Hockey World Cup - European Qualifier
FIH Hockey World Cup - European Qualifier
Women's Hockey World Cup qualifiers
European Qualifier